Maarten Harpertszoon Tromp (also written as Maerten Tromp; 23 April 1598 – 31 July 1653) was a Dutch army general and admiral in the Dutch navy. 

Son of a ship's captain, Tromp spent much of his childhood at sea, including being captured by pirates and enslaved by Barbary Corsairs. In adult life, he became a renowned ship captain and naval commander, successfully leading Dutch forces fighting for independence in the Eighty Years War, and then against England in the First Anglo-Dutch War, proving an innovative tactician and enabling the newly independent Dutch nation to become a major sea power. He was killed in battle by a sharpshooter from an English ship. Several ships of the Royal Netherlands Navy have carried the name HNLMS Tromp after him and/or his son Cornelis, also a Dutch Admiral of some renown.

Early life

Born in Brielle, Tromp was the oldest son of Harpert Maertensz, a naval officer and captain of the frigate Olifantstromp ("Elephant Trunk"). The surname Tromp probably derives from the name of the ship; it first appeared in documents in 1607. His mother supplemented the family's income as a washerwoman. At the age of nine, Tromp went to sea with his father, and he was present in a squadron covering the Dutch main fleet fighting the Battle of Gibraltar in 1607.

In 1610, after his father's discharge because of a navy reorganization, the Tromps were on their way to Guinea on their merchantman when they were attacked by a squadron of seven ships under command of the English pirate Peter Easton. During the fight, Tromp's father was slain by a cannonball. According to legend, the 12-year-old boy rallied the crew of the ship with the cry "Won't you avenge my father's death?" The pirates seized him and sold him on the slave market of Salé. Two years later, Easton was moved by pity and ordered his redemption.

Set free, he supported his mother and three sisters by working in a Rotterdam shipyard. Tromp went to sea again at 19, briefly working for the navy, but he was captured again in 1621 after having rejoined the merchant fleet, this time by Barbary corsairs off Tunis. He was kept as a slave until the age of 24 and by then had so impressed the Bey of Tunis and the corsair John Ward with his skills in gunnery and navigation that the latter offered him a position in his fleet. When Tromp refused, the Bey was even more impressed by this show of character and allowed him to leave as a free man.

He joined the Dutch navy as a lieutenant in July 1622, entering service with the Admiralty of the Maze based in Rotterdam. On 7 May 1624, he married Dignom Cornelisdochter de Haes, the daughter of a merchant; in the same year he became captain of the St. Antonius, an advice yacht (fast-sailing messenger ship). His first distinction was as Lieutenant-Admiral Piet Hein's flag captain on the Vliegende Groene Draeck during the fight with Ostend privateers in 1629 in which Hein was killed.

In 1629 and 1630, the year that he was appointed full captain on initiative of stadtholder Frederick Henry himself, Tromp was very successful in fighting the Dunkirkers as a squadron commander, functioning as a commandeur on the Vliegende Groene Draeck. Despite receiving four honorary golden chains, he was not promoted further. The Vliegende Groene Draeck foundered and new heavy vessels were reserved for the flag officers while Tromp was relegated to the old Prins Hendrik.

In 1634, Tromp's first wife died, and he left the naval service in 1634 in disappointment. He became a deacon and married Alijth Jacobsdochter Arckenboudt, the daughter of Brill's wealthy schepen and tax collector, on 12 September 1634.

Supreme commander of the confederate fleet

In 1637, Tromp was promoted from captain to Lieutenant-Admiral of Holland and West Frisia in 1637, following the dismissal of Lieutenant-Admiral Philips van Dorp, Vice-Admiral Jasper Liefhebber, and other flag officers due to incompetence.

Although formally ranking under the Admiral-General Frederick Henry of Orange, he was the de facto supreme commander of the Dutch fleet, as the stadtholders never fought at sea. Tromp was mostly occupied with blockading the privateer port of Dunkirk. Both Tromp and Witte de With, who was named as Vice-Admiral, had been born in Den Briel and served as flag captains of Piet Hein.

In 1639, during the Dutch struggle for independence from Spain, Tromp defeated a large Spanish fleet bound for Flanders at the Battle of the Downs, marking the end of Spanish naval power. In a preliminary battle, the action of 18 September 1639, Tromp was the first fleet commander known for the deliberate use of line of battle tactics. His flagship in this period was the Aemilia.

In 1643 the subject was the center of a parliamentary investigation of naval intrigue with the Queen of England and the Prince of Orange who had allegedly instructed the Vice-Admiral to allow passage of two frigates purchased by English royalists in Dunkirk.

In the First Anglo-Dutch War of 1652 to 1653, Tromp commanded the Dutch fleet in the battles of Dover, Dungeness, Portland, the Gabbard and Scheveningen. In the latter, he was killed by a sharpshooter in the rigging of William Penn's ship. His acting flag captain, Egbert Bartholomeusz Kortenaer, on the Brederode kept up fleet morale by not lowering Tromp's standard, pretending Tromp was still alive.

Tromp's death was a severe blow to the Dutch navy but also to the Orangists, who sought the defeat of the Commonwealth of England and the restoration of the Stuart monarchy. Republican influence strengthened after Scheveningen, which led to peace negotiations with the Commonwealth, culminating in the Treaty of Westminster.

During his career, his main rival was Vice-Admiral Witte de With, who also served the Admiralty of Rotterdam (de Maze) from 1637. De With temporarily replaced him as supreme commander for the Battle of Kentish Knock. Tromp's successor was Lieutenant-Admiral Jacob van Wassenaer Obdam.

References

Roger Hainsworth and Christine Churches, The Anglo Dutch Naval Wars 1652-1674, Sutton Pub Ltd, 1998
Oliver Warner, Great Sea Battles, Spring Books London, 1973
R. Prud’homme van Reine, Schittering en Schandaal. Dubbelbiografie van Maerten en  Cornelis Tromp, Arbeiderspers, 2001
 Warnsinck, JCM, Twaalf doorluchtige zeehelden, PN van Kampen & Zoon NV, 1941
 Warnsinck, JCM, Van Vlootvoogden en Zeeslagen, PN van Kampen & Zoon, 1940

External links 
 

17th-century Dutch military personnel
1598 births
1653 deaths
Admirals of the navy of the Dutch Republic
Burials at the Oude Kerk, Delft
Dutch military personnel killed in action
Dutch naval personnel of the Anglo-Dutch Wars
Dutch people of the Eighty Years' War (United Provinces)
Naval commanders of the Eighty Years' War
People from Brielle